Julie Pichard du Page (born 6 October 1973) is a Canadian actress and model.

Early life and career
Du Page was born in Paris into a family of French nobility but spent the most of her life in Montreal, Quebec, Canada, later moving back to Paris to pursue her acting career.

Filmography
 Scoop (unknown episodes, 1992) .... Sophie / Carla
 Au nom du père et du fils (unknown episodes, 1993) .... Léonie Lafresnière (25 years old)
 Monsieur Ripois (1993) (TV) .... Nancy
 Highlander (1 episode, "Warmonger", 1994) .... Nicole
 L'ours en peluche (1994) ....
 Extrême limite (42 episodes, 1994–1995) .... Juliette
 The Hardy Boys (1 episode, "No Dice", 1995)  .... Jeanette Nordeau
 Les steenfort, maîtres de l'orge (1996) TV mini-series .... Adrienne
 Le jour et la nuit (1997) .... Norma
 Hors limites (2 episodes, "Le piège" and "Mariages à la bulgare", 1997) .... Juliette Renaud
 Les cordier, juge et flic (1 episode, "L'étoile filante", 1998)  .... Marie-Sophie Maurin
 H (1 episode, "Un mensonge", 1998)  .... Corinne
 Jusqu'à ce que la mort nous sépare (1999) (TV) .... Nathalie
 Les boeuf-carottes (2 episodes, "Haute voltige" and "La fée du logis", 1999–2000) .... Sylvie Kaan
 Sous le soleil (4 episodes, "Autorité parentale", "L'une ou l'autre", "Le choix de Victoria" and "L'accident", 2000) ....
 On n'est pas là pour s'aimer (2000) (TV) .... Carole
 Hautes fréquences (2001) (TV) .... Julie
 The Race (2002) .... Cécilia Gautier, la journaliste
 Cradle 2 the Grave (2003) .... French Buyer
 Betrayal (2003) .... Jayne Ferré
 Lance et compte: La reconquête (unknown episodes, 2004) .... Valérie Nantel
 Life with My Father (La Vie avec mon père) (2005) .... Macha
 Lance et compte: La revanche (unknown episodes, 2006) .... Valérie
 Twice Upon a Time (2006) .... Isabelle Carrington
 Transit (2008) .... Julie
 Je me souviens (2009) .... Marguerite Karsh
 C.A. (1 episode, "Épilogue", 2010) .... Sonia

References

External links
 

1973 births
Actresses from Montreal
Actresses from Paris
French female models
French film actresses
French television actresses
Living people